Billy Bowlegs may refer to:
 Billy Bowlegs ( 1810–1859), Seminole chief during the Second and Third Seminole Wars
 Billy Bowlegs III (1862–1965), Seminole elder and historian named after the chief